Trithemis grouti, the Black Dropwing, is a species of dragonfly in the family Libellulidae. It is found in Angola, Benin, Burkina Faso, Cameroon, the Republic of the Congo, the Democratic Republic of the Congo, Ivory Coast, Equatorial Guinea, Gabon, Gambia, Ghana, Guinea, Liberia, Nigeria, Sierra Leone, Uganda, and Zambia. Its natural habitats are subtropical or tropical moist lowland forests and rivers.

References

grouti
Taxonomy articles created by Polbot
Insects described in 1961